Kilchoan is a village on the Scottish peninsula of Ardnamurchan, beside the Sound of Mull in Lochaber, Highland. It is the most westerly village in mainland Britain, although several tiny hamlets lie further west on the peninsula (of these, the most westerly is called Portuairk). The western linear, coastal parts of the village are Ormsaigmore and Ormsaigbeg.

Kilchoan has a population of about 150 people altogether.

History
It may also be the 'Muirbole Paradisi' mentioned by Adomnán.

For many years following the 1688 overthrow and exile of the House of Stuart, the historic parish church at Kilchoan, which was dedicated to Saint Comgan and which is now in ruins, was a Non-juring Episcopal parish within the Church of Scotland. South Uist native Mhaighstir Alasdair MacDhòmhnaill, 1st of Dalilea, was the Rector of Kilchoan until his death around 1724. In addition to being well known locally as a folk hero, Maighstir Alasdair MacDhòmhnaill was also the father of poet Alasdair mac Mhaighstir Alasdair, who served as the Gaelic tutor to Prince Charles Edward Stuart during the Jacobite rising of 1745 and who remains, along with Sorley MacLean, one of the two most important writers in the whole history of Scottish Gaelic literature.

Landmarks
The ancient Mingary Castle is on the coast about 1 km east of the village.

Examples of a type of igneous rock structure called a cone sheet are found at Kilchoan.

Below the slope north-west of the village street is a chambered cairn, Greadal Fhinn.

Ben Hiant is the highest point of the peninsula at 528 m and lies between the village and the coastal hamlet of Ardslignish.

Tourism and amenities

Transport
A regular CalMac ferry service runs from Kilchoan to Tobermory on the Isle of Mull. To and from the regional centre of Fort William, one bus per day Monday to Saturday connects with the ferry via Salen and the Corran Ferry

Kilchoan Bay
Kilchoan Bay has four visitor moorings, a ferry jetty, a shop with a post office, showers and a petrol station.

Hospitality
The Kilchoan House Hotel is now the most westerly bar/hotel on the mainland of the UK, after the closure of Sonachan Hotel.

Ardnamurchan Campsite, Kilchoan.

Geology
The minerals kilchoanite, dellaite and rustumite were first found at Kilchoan. A natural history museum is adjacent to the hamlet to the east at the coastal hamlet of Glenmore.

Notable residents
 Hamza Yassin, cameraman and Strictly Come Dancing champion.

Notes and references
References

Notes

External links

Populated places in Lochaber
Ports and harbours of Scotland
Ardnamurchan